Devendra is a common Indian masculine given name. It comes from Sanskrit   'chief of the gods', which has been used as an epithet of the Vedic god Indra.

A list of persons with the name

Devendra Banhart, Venezuelan/American musician
Devendra Bishoo, West Indies cricketer
Devendra Fadnavis, Indian politician
Devendra Goel, Indian filmmaker
Devendra Jhajharia, Indian javelin thrower
Devendra Kumar Joshi, the Indian Chief of Naval Staff
Devendra Pandey, an Indian politician who is best known for hijacking an airplane in 1978
Devendra Prabhudesai, Indian biographer
Devendra Prasad Gupta, Indian academic
Debendra Prasad Ghosh, Indian writer
Devendra Prasad Yadav, Indian politician
Dev Alahan, a fictional character in ITV soap Coronation Street
Devendra Singh, Indian Banker and a versatile personality

References

Indian masculine given names